The Silver Jubilee of Queen Elizabeth II marked the 25th anniversary of Queen Elizabeth II's accession to the thrones of the United Kingdom and other Commonwealth realms. It was celebrated with large-scale parties and parades throughout the United Kingdom and the Commonwealth throughout 1977, culminating in June with the official "Jubilee Days", held to coincide with the Queen's Official Birthday. The anniversary date itself was commemorated in church services across the land on 6 February 1977, and continued throughout the month. In March, preparations started for large parties in every major city of the United Kingdom, as well as for smaller ones for countless individual streets throughout the country.

The Queen had the following engagements during her Silver Jubilee:

February
10 February – Royal Visit to American Samoa
11 February – Royal Visit to Western Samoa
14 February – Royal Visit to Tonga
16–17 February – Royal Visit to Fiji
22 February – 7 March – Royal Visit to New Zealand including
26 February – Visit to the Maori Festival at Gisborne
28 February – State Opening of Parliament, Wellington

March
1 March – Visit to Queen Carnival 2 March. Visit Mosgiel (NZ) and Royal NZ Aero Club Air Show.
7–30 March – Royal Visit to Australia, including
8 March – State Opening of Parliament, Canberra
11 March – Royal Visit to Launceston, Tasmania and Newcastle, New South Wales
14 March – Royal Visit to Sydney
21 March – Royal Visit to Nuriootpa, South Australia
30 March – Royal Visit to Perth
23–25 March – Royal Visit to Papua New Guinea
30 March – Royal Visit to Bombay
31 March – Royal Visit to Muscat, Oman

April
11 April – Launch of London Transport's Silver Jubilee buses.

May
3 May – Launch of HMS Invincible by Queen Elizabeth II at Barrow-in-Furness
4 May – The Queen receives addresses from the House of Commons and the House of Lords
6 May – Royal Review of the Police, Hendon
7 May – Royal Review of Rolls-Royces, Windsor Castle
10 May – Royal reception for delegates to the NATO Ministerial Council Meeting
11 May – Issue of the British Silver Jubilee stamps
13 May – Biggin Hill Air Fair
14–15 May – Historic Aircraft Display, White Waltham
15 May – The Queen receives the horse "Centennial" from the Commissioner of the Royal Canadian Mounted Police
16 May – Royal visit to the Royal Horticultural Society's Chelsea Show
17 May – Royal Visit to Glasgow (including football match, the Glasgow FA Select v the Football League XI, Hampden Park)
18 May – Royal Visit to Cumbernauld and Stirling
19 May – Royal Visit to Perth and Dundee
20 May – Royal Visit to Aberdeen
23 May – Royal Visit to Edinburgh
27 May – British Genius Exhibition, Battersea Park (until 30 October)
28 May – Royal Visit to Windsor
30 May – The Queen attends gala performance of opera and ballet, Royal Opera House, Covent Garden

June
6 June – lighting of bonfire chain, Windsor
7 June – Silver Jubilee Bank Holiday
8 June – Commonwealth Heads of Government Meeting 1977, Lancaster House
9 June – Royal Visit to Greenwich and River Progress
11 June – Trooping of the Colour
12 June – Royal salute at march past of Royal British Legion Standards
13 June – Garter Service, Windsor Castle
16 June – Silver Jubilee Test match, Lord's Cricket Ground (Australia v England)
20 June – Royal Visit to Lancaster, Preston, Leigh, Stretford, and Manchester
21 June – Royal Visit to St. Helens, Liverpool and Bootle Stockport
22 June – Royal Visit to Harlech Castle, Blaenau Ffestiniog, Llandudno, Conwy, Bangor and Holyhead
23 June – Royal Visit to Milford Haven, Haverfordwest, Carmarthen, Llanelli, Swansea, Neath and Barry
24 June – Royal Visit to Cardiff and Risca
28 June – Royal Review of the Royal Navy, Spithead
29 June – Royal Visit to Portsmouth
30 June – Royal Visit to South London and Royal Review of Reserve & Cadet Forces Wembley Stadium

July
1 July – Royal Visit to Wimbledon
4 July – Guildford Silver Jubilee Pageant (attended by Princess Anne on 6 July) (until 16 July)
6 July – Royal Visit to North London
7 July – Royal Review of the British Army of the Rhine, Germany
10 July – Silver Jubilee Powerboat Race, from HMS Belfast to Calais
11 July – Royal Visit to Norwich, Ipswich and Felixstowe
12 July – Royal Visit to Grimsby, Doncaster, Sheffield, Barnsley and Leeds
13 July – Royal Visit to Wakefield, Harrogate, Beverley, York and Hull
14 July – Royal Visit to Middlesbrough, Hartlepool (including naming of RNLB The Scout), Eston and Durham
15 July – Royal Visit to Newcastle-upon-Tyne and Sunderland
19 July – Royal Visit to Royal Tournament, Earl's Court
27 July – Royal Visit to Wolverhampton, Dudley, West Bromwich, Walsall, Birmingham, Hampton-in-Arden, Solihull and Coventry
28 July – Royal Visit to Leicester, Chesterfield, Mansfield, Derby and Nottingham
29 July – Royal Review of the Royal Air Force, RAF Finningley

August
3 August – Colchester Searchlight Tattoo
4 August – Cardiff Silver Jubilee Tattoo
4 August – Royal Visit to Southampton
5 August – Royal Visit to Torbay, Exeter and Plymouth (including Royal Review of the Royal Marines)
6 August – Royal Visit to Falmouth, Truro, Bodmin and St. Austell
7 August – Royal Visit to Lundy (a private visit as "time off" from the official tour)
8 August – Royal Visit to Bristol, Northavon, Bath, Keynsham and Weston-super-Mare
10 August – Royal Visit to Belfast
11 August – Royal Visit to Derry
13 August – Open Day, RAF Lossiemouth
18 August – Edinburgh Military Tattoo, Edinburgh Castle
20 August – Greenwich Jubilee Clipper Week Regetta
27–29 August – Plymouth Navy Days

September
10 September – Lions v Barbarians Rugby Match, Twickenham
15–17 September – Ryder Cup, Royal Lytham & St Annes Golf Club

October
14–19 October – Royal Visit to Canada including
18 October – State Opening of Parliament, Ottawa
19–20 October – Royal Visit to the Bahamas
20 October – Royal Visit to the British Virgin Islands
28 October – Royal Visit to Antigua and Barbuda
30 October – Royal Visit to Mustique
31 October – Royal Visit to Barbados

November
22 November – Leeds United v Ajax football match, Leeds
28 November – Hong Kong Silver Jubilee Pageant

December
16 December – Royal opening of Piccadilly line extension to Heathrow Central
25 December – Royal Christmas Message is broadcast to the Commonwealth

Notes

References

Elizabeth II, Silver Jubilee
Silver Jubilee of Elizabeth II
Silver Jubilee
Silver Jubilee of Elizabeth II
Elizabeth II, Silver Jubilee